The National Games of the People's Republic of China, sometimes known as the All China Games (though not to be confused with the All-China Games), is the premier sports event in China at national level. It is usually held once every four years, most recently in September 2021, when the 14th National Games of China took place in Xi'an.

The forerunner of the Games was the Chinese National Games, first held in 1910 during the Qing dynasty. This tournament ran until 1948 and the competition was relaunched under its current name in 1959, following the formation of the People's Republic of China. On the other hand, the Chinese National Games continues to be held by the Republic of China which is now based in Taiwan.

List of the National Games of China

Statistics

See also
 All-China Games
 Asian Games
 China National Youth Games
 East Asian Games
 Football at the National Games of China
 National Peasants' Games
 Olympic Games
 Sport in China

References

External links 
 Partial list from the Chinese Olympic Committee

 
China
Multi-sport events in China
1910 establishments in China
Recurring sporting events established in 1910
1959 establishments in China
Recurring sporting events established in 1959